Sørlle Rocks is a group of rocks, the highest  high, lying  west of Moreton Point, the west extremity of Coronation Island in the South Orkney Islands. It was named Tre Sten ("three stones") on Captain Petter Sørlle's chart resulting from his 1912-13 survey. Later renamed for Sørlle by DI personnel on the Discovery II following their survey in 1933.

References

Rock formations of the South Orkney Islands